The Philip Merrill Environmental Center is a Green building owned and operated by the Chesapeake Bay Foundation. Built in 2001, the Merrill Center is located in Annapolis, Maryland on the western shore of the Chesapeake Bay. The building serves as the headquarters office building for the CBF, but is also available to rent for business and social occasions.

The center is named for Philip Merrill, an American diplomat, publisher, banker, and philanthropist. The building was the first to receive the Leadership in Energy and Environmental Design (LEED) "Platinum" rating from the United States Green Building Council. This recognition confirmed that the center was the most environmentally friendly building in the country at the time when it was built. Items used in the building include recycled materials, renewable resources, and passive and active solar power and use.

Outdoor education program 
Located at the Merrill Center is one of the foundation's one-day field programs for students and educators. This program makes use of an exceptional location between the shores of the Bay, the woods of Bay Ridge, the tidal marsh of Black Walnut Creek, and the local fields of tall native grasses to present a one-day, hands-on experience of the Bay ecosystem. Students may explore a variety of settings within the  property, by foot or by water. While experiencing the natural surroundings, students will survey the flora and fauna that make up an ecosystem's biodiversity.

References

Leadership in Energy and Environmental Design platinum certified buildings